This is a list of encyclopedic persons (students, alumni, faculty, staff, or academic affiliates) associated with California State University, Sacramento (Sacramento State).

Alumni

Arts

Television and movies
 Carlos Alazraqui – actor, comedian – Reno 911!
 Jeffrey Boam (B.A. in Art) – screenwriter, producer 
 Creed Bratton – actor, The Office
 Antoinette "Butterscotch" Clinton, finalist, America's Got Talent, season 2
 Kurt Caceres – actor
 Joe Carnahan (B.A. in Filmography) – film director, Smokin' Aces, The A-Team
 Ryan Coogler (BS in Business Administration (Finance))– director of 2015 film Creed and  Black Panther
 Giselle Fernández (B.A. in Journalism and Government) – former KTLA Morning News anchor
 Joseph Gutheinz (B.A. and M.A. in Criminal Justice) – retired attorney, appears in documentaries Moon for Sale and  The Case of the Missing Moon Rocks
 Tom Hanks – Academy Award-winning film actor, director and producer
 Kristine Hanson (B.A. Communications, 1974) – television broadcaster, Playboy Playmate of the Month 
 Joanna Hernandez – season one of the Bad Girls Club and winner of season one of For the Love of Ray J
 Lester Holt (B.A. Government) – anchor for flagship broadcast NBC Nightly News, host of Dateline and co-anchor of weekend edition of Today
 Karen Kilgariff – co-host of podcast My Favorite Murder, former head writer of The Ellen DeGeneres Show and The Rosie Show
 Kayden Kross – adult film actress
 Joan Lunden (formerly known as Joanie Blunden) (B.A. Liberal Arts) – television personality, former co-host of Good Morning America
 Bridget Marquardt (B.A. Public Relations, 1998) – girlfriend of Hugh Hefner, featured on E! TV show The Girls Next Door
 Brian Posehn – stand-up comedian
 Rick Rossovich – actor, The Terminator, Top Gun, Roxanne
 Billy Marshall Stoneking (B.A. English, minor Philosophy, 1970) – Australian/American poet, filmmaker, writer, script editor and teacher
 Graham Streeter (BA Japanese and Business Administration) – screenwriter, film director
 Rene Syler (BA Psychology, 1987) – television personality, former host of The Early Show on CBS
 Shauvon Torres – cast member of The Real World, Sydney

 Matt Dearborn - Creator of Even Stevens

Musicians
 Chi Cheng – bassist
 Baldwin Chiu – actor, rapper as (Only Won) 
 David Hodo (B.A. in Speech, 1969) – member of Village People
 Richard Maloof – musician
 Bobby McFerrin – composer and Grammy Award-winning musician ("Don't Worry, Be Happy")
 Charlie Peacock – singer
 Steve Turre – musician on Saturday Night Live

Fine artists
 Fred Uhl Ball (BA and MA Art) – enamelist
 Jack Cassinetto (BA Art and English, 1966) – plein air painter
 Michael Patrick Cronan (BA Fine Arts 1974) – graphic designer and artist
Xiomara De Oliver (BA 1988) – Canadian Black painter.
 Mel Ramos (BA and MA, 1957) – artist
 Fritz Scholder (BA 1960) – Native American artist
 Wayne Thiebaud – artist and painter

Politicians and government

 Janice Rogers Brown – Federal Appeals Court judge
 Christopher Cabaldon (Master's Public Policy and Administration 1994)– West Sacramento Mayor 
 Edward Chavez – Mayor of Stockton 2005–09
 Lloyd Connelly – Sacramento County Judge  
 Ward Connerly (BA Government, 1962) – former University of California regent and political activist
 Mervyn Dymally (MA Government) – Lieutenant Governor of California 1975–79, U.S. Representative 1981–93, Assemblyman 2002–08
 Bill Emmerson – California State Senator
 Noreen Evans – California State Assemblywoman
 Victor H. Fazio – U.S. Congressman 1979–99
 Bradford Fenocchio (BA Criminal Justice) – Placer County District Attorney
 Cathleen Galgiani – California State Assemblywoman
 Wally Herger – U.S. Congressman 1987–2013
 Karen Humphrey (MA Public Policy and Women's Studies) – Mayor of Fresno 1989–93
 Phil Isenberg – Assemblyman 1982–96, Mayor of Sacramento 1975–82 
 Grantland Johnson – former California Cabinet official 
 Patrick Johnston – former California State Legislator
 Bill Leonard – former State Board of Equalization Member and legislator
 Lloyd Levine – former California State Assemblyman
 Daniel Logue – California State Assemblyman
 Kevin McCarthy – alumnus of school's Capital Fellows Program, U.S. Congressman for California's 23rd congressional district
 Kevin McCarty (Master's Public Policy and Administration 2011)- California State Assemblyman
 Cathy Mitchell – former Acting California Secretary of State
 Don Nottoli – Sacramento County Supervisor, 5th district 
 George A. Plescia – former California State Assemblyman
 Richard Rainey – former California State Senator 
 Robert Rivas - incoming speaker of the California State Assembly
 Jan Scully – Sacramento County District Attorney
 Joe Serna – Mayor of Sacramento 1992–99
 Frank Skartados – New York State Assemblyman, 2009–11 and 2013–18
 Lori Wilson - CA State Assemblymember 2022-present

International politicians
 Fernando Chui – Chief Executive of Macau
 Rudolf Hommes – Colombian politician and academic
 Mahmoud Vaezi – Chief of Staff of the President of Iran

Business
 Dale Carlsen – Sleep Train Mattress Centers founder
 Doug Lipp (MA in International Business Communications) – consultant, speaker, author, CEO and president of G. Douglas Lipp & Associates
 Angelo Tsakopoulos (BA Government, BS Business Administration, Honorary Doctorate in Human Letters) – real estate mogul

Authors and academics
 Ann Bannon – lesbian pulp fiction author, professor
 Russ Buettner — Pulitzer Prize winning journalist for The New York Times
 Raymond Carver – fiction author, poet, screenwriter
 Richard Ebeling (BA in Economics) – libertarian author, President of Foundation for Economic Education
 John Fund - American political journalist, currently national-affairs reporter for National Review Online 
 Chester Gorman – anthropologist
 Marisa Kelly (BA in 1986) - political scientist and President of Suffolk University in Boston, Massachusetts
 Janet Nichols Lynch – writer and professor
Mary Mackey – fiction author, poet, screenwriter, and professor Emeritus (English)
 Richard J. Maybury – economist and author on topics of international business, law, history, juris naturalism
 Laura Moriarty – poet and novelist
 Alan Reynolds – economist and author
 Tukufu Zuberi – professor and Chairman of Sociology Department, University of Pennsylvania

Other notables
 Anthony Sadler, assisted in thwarting 2015 French train terror attack.

Athletes

Baseball

Scott Burcham – baseball shortstop in the Colorado Rockies organization
 Rhys Hoskins (born 1993) - first baseman for the Philadelphia Phillies
 Ethan Katz (born 1983) - pitching coach for the Chicago White Sox
Sam Long (born 1995) - San Francisco Giants baseball player
 Buck Martinez – 17-year MLB catcher and later an MLB manager
 Alyssa Nakken - the first female coach in Major League Baseball
 James Outman - outfielder for the Los Angeles Dodgers

Basketball

Cody Demps (born 1993) - basketball player for Hapoel Be'er Sheva of the Israeli Basketball Premier League
Nick Hornsby (born  1995) - basketball player for Hapoel Be'er Sheva in the Israeli Basketball Premier League
 Joel Jones (born 1981) – member of the Puerto Rican national basketball team
Joshua Patton (born 1997) - basketball player in the Israeli Basketball Premier League

Football

 Otis Amey – wide receiver for San Francisco 49ers, Atlanta Falcons, Cleveland Gladiators, Austin Wranglers, Sacramento Mountain Lions
 McLeod Bethel-Thompson – quarterback for Minnesota Vikings
 Mike Carter – former NFL wide receiver
 Marko Cavka – offensive lineman for Hamilton Tiger-Cats of Canadian Football League
 Dan Chamberlain – played for Detroit Lions
 Jeff Fleming – former Sacramento State player
 Aaron Garcia – quarterback for Jacksonville Sharks of AF1
 John Gesek – former National Football League offensive lineman
 Tyronne Gross – running back for San Diego Chargers
 Jon Kirksey – defensive tackle, New Orleans Saints, St. Louis Rams
 Lorenzo Lynch – former NFL defensive back
 Zack Nash – linebacker for Arizona Cardinals 2012
 Lonie Paxton – lineman for Denver Broncos
 Ricky Ray – quarterback for Toronto Argonauts of Canadian Football League
 Charles Roberts – running back for B.C. Lions of Canadian Football League
 Kato Serwanga – NFL cornerback from 1998–2003
 Wasswa Serwanga – NFL cornerback from 1999–2003
 Daimon Shelton – nine-year NFL fullback
Softball
Alyssa Nakken – first female coach in MLB for the San Francisco Giants

Other sports

 Joe Enochs (born 1971) – former professional soccer player
 Jamel Mitchell (born 1975) – Major League Soccer player
 Benji Kikanović - Major League Soccer player

Sports figures (non-athletes)
 Darren Arbet – coach for San Jose SaberCats of AFL
 Clancy Barone – tight ends coach for Minnesota Vikings, offensive line coach for Denver Broncos
 Pat Doyle – baseball coach
 Brian Katz – Sacramento State men's basketball coach
 Greg Knapp – quarterbacks coach
 Mike Lange – sports broadcaster and member of Hockey Hall of Fame

Faculty, staff, and other academics

Current
 Robert S. Nelsen – University president
 Joseph Palermo – associate professor of history, author
 Mona L. Siegel - professor of history
 Stephanie Brown Trafton – athletics coach, Olympic gold medalist
 Michael G. Vann - professor of history

Emeritus
 Ann Bannon – Professor of English, Associate Dean in College of Arts and Sciences
 Paul Goldstene – Professor of Government
 Stephen L. Harris – Professor and Chair of Humanities and Religious Studies
 Wes Jackson – Professor of Environmental Sciences
 Frank Kofsky – Professor of History
Mary Mackey – professor of English and Writer-in-Residence
 Joe Serna, Jr. – Professor of Government
 Miklos Udvardy – Professor of Biological Sciences
 Angus Wright – Professor of Environmental Sciences

Former
 Maya Angelou - poet, professor
 Peter Grandbois – Professor of English 2006–2010
 Paul Carter Harrison – Professor of Theatre (1970–1972)
 Enrique Herrscher – Fulbright Professor in Residence of Economics
 R. Joseph Hoffmann – Professor of Humanities and Religious Studies
 Oliver Lee Jackson – Professor in Pan African Studies, 1971 to 2002
 Virginia Matzek –  Professor in Environmental Studies and Sciences
 Charles Postel – 2008 Bancroft Prize recipient and Frederick Jackson Turner Award recipient, Professor of History

Adjunct
 Phil Isenberg – Graduate School of Public Policy
 Barry Keene – former State Senator, Professor of Government

Former administrators
 W. Lloyd Johns – former University president; president of Gallaudet University
 Jolene Koester – former Professor of Communication Studies followed by Provost; President of California State University, Northridge

References

California State University, Sacramento alumni
Sacramento State